Vittorio Cristini (24 May 1928 in Sora – 29 September 1974) was an Italian professional football player.

He played 5 games and scored 1 goal in the Serie A for A.S. Roma in the 1948/49 season.

References

1928 births
1974 deaths
Italian footballers
Serie A players
A.S. Roma players
People from Sora, Lazio
Association football forwards
Footballers from Lazio
Sportspeople from the Province of Frosinone